Choctella is a genus of millipedes in the monotypic family Choctellidae. Its two species are native to the south-eastern United States.  C. cumminsi Chamberlin, 1918, occurs on the Cumberland Plateau from central Tennessee to northern Alabama and C. hubrichti Hoffman, 1965, occurs in central Alabama.

References

Spirostreptida
Articles created by Qbugbot
Millipedes of North America
Fauna of the Southeastern United States